The Brooklyn Kings were a United States Basketball League franchise in Brooklyn, New York. They played in Downtown Brooklyn, on the main campus of Long Island University. They started play in 1999. The league suspended operations after the 2007 season and the team has been inactive since then.

History 
On March 25, 1999, the USBL announced that the league would add a new franchise based in Brooklyn. The team was officially announced on April 19, 1999 by the New York City Mayor's office; the owner was Mohammed A. Nur and the first coach was Sam Worthen. The team played their games at the Schwartz Athletic Center in Brooklyn; among the members of the team's inaugural roster were Tremaine Fowlkes, Gordon Malone, Brian Reese and Ed "Booger" Smith. The Kings ended their first season with a 10–16 record, ranking third in the USBL Northern Division. Junie Sanders was selected in the All-USBL First Team.

In 2000, the team appointed Ken Charles as their new head coach, and they finished the season as second-to-last in the Northern Division with an 11–19 record. In 2001 the record improved to 12–17 (.414), but in 2002 the team had their worst season, and finished with a 7–23 record (.233). In 2003 the team had former St. John's alumni Anthony Glover and Chudney Gray in their roster, in addition to former NBA players Charles Jones and Rodrick Rhodes, and former top high school player Lenny Cooke. The team finished with a 12–18 record in the regular season and advanced to the postseason for the first time in their history: they lost to the Pennsylvania ValleyDawgs, 116–122. Cooke was the league leader in scoring (28.8 points), steals per game (2.8) and offensive rebounds per game (4.7): he was named the USBL Rookie of the Year, while Anthony Glover made the All-Rookie team.

In 2004, the team won the Eastern Division with a 20–10 record, and advanced to the playoffs.  They beat the Oklahoma Storm in the quarterfinals and the Kansas Cagerz in the semifinals, reaching the USBL championship game. In the USBL final game the Kings lost to the Pennsylvania ValleyDawgs, 116–118. Kings player Chudney Gray was named USBL Player of the Year and was selected in the All-USBL First Team, together with teammate B. J. Mc Farlan.

The Brooklyn Kings topped the East Division again in 2005 with the best record of their history (21–9, .700): they again qualified for the playoffs, where they were eliminated by the Nebraska Cranes, 117–110. Coach Ken Charles was named USBL Coach of the Year and Anthony Glover, who led the USBL in steals, was named in the All-USBL First Team along with teammate B. J. McFarlan. The 2006 season saw the Kings rank first in the East Division once again, this time with an 18–12 record; the team was eliminated in the quarterfinal game of the playoffs by the Kansas Cagerz. In 2007, the final USBL season, the Kings made the playoffs with an 8–8 record, and advanced to the championship game, where they lost to the Kansas Cagerz, 92–95. Kings player Abdul Mills was named in the All-USBL First Team.

Season-by-season records 

Source:

Notable players 

 Adrian Autry
 Alpha Bangura
 Lenny Cooke
 Tremaine Fowlkes
 Anthony Glover
 Chudney Gray
 Charles Jones
 Louis White
 Thomas Jordan
 Gordon Malone
 Jerry Reynolds
 Rodrick Rhodes
 Ed "Booger" Smith
 Dwayne Whitfield

References

External links 
Brooklyn Kings – Discussion Forum
Brooklyn Kings via USbasket.com
Brooklyn Kings via InsideHoops.com

United States Basketball League teams
Sports in Brooklyn
Basketball teams in New York City
Basketball teams in New York (state)
Basketball teams established in 1999
Basketball teams disestablished in 2007
1999 establishments in New York City
2007 disestablishments in New York (state)